The Olympic qualifying event was held from 5–10 December 2017 in Plzeň, Czech Republic. The qualification event was open to any nations that earned qualification points at the 2016 or 2017 World Curling Championships or participated at the 2014 or 2015 World Curling Championships (the Czech men's team, the Norway & the Latvia women's team). The top two teams from the qualification event qualified their nations to participate in the Olympics.

Competition format
In both the men's and the women's tournaments, the teams played a single round robin, and at its conclusion, the top three teams advanced to the playoffs. In the playoffs, the first and second seeds played a game to determine the first team to advance to the main Olympic tournament. The loser of this game, along with the third seed, played a game to determine the second team to advance to the main Olympic tournament.

Men

Teams

Round-robin standings
Final round-robin standings

Round-robin results
All draw times are listed in Central European Time (UTC+1).

Draw 1
Tuesday, December 5, 20:00

Draw 2
Wednesday, December 6, 12:00

Draw 3
Wednesday, December 6, 20:00

Draw 4
Thursday, December 7, 14:00

Draw 5
Friday, December 8, 9:00

Draw 6
Friday, December 8, 19:00

Draw 7
Saturday, December 9, 13:00

Playoffs

First qualifier
Sunday, December 10, 8:00

Second qualifier
Sunday, December 10, 16:00

Women

Teams

Round-robin standings
Final round-robin standings

Round-robin results
All draw times are listed in Central European Time (UTC+1).

Draw 1
Tuesday, December 5, 15:00

Draw 2
Wednesday, December 6, 8:00

Draw 3
Wednesday, December 6, 16:00

Draw 4
Thursday, December 7, 9:00

Draw 5
Thursday, December 7, 19:00

Draw 6
Friday, December 8, 14:00

Draw 7
Saturday, December 9, 9:00

Playoffs

First qualifier
Saturday, December 9, 19:00

Second qualifier
Sunday, December 10, 12:00

References

Specific

General

qualification
Qualification tournaments for the 2018 Winter Olympics
Winter Olympics qualification
2017 in Czech sport
Sport in Plzeň
International curling competitions hosted by the Czech Republic
December 2017 sports events in Europe